Octave Lapize (24 October 1887 – 14 July 1917) was a French professional road racing cyclist and track cyclist.

Most famous for winning the 1910 Tour de France and a bronze medal at the 1908 Summer Olympics in the men's 100 kilometres, he was a three-time winner of one-day classics, Paris–Roubaix and Paris–Brussels.

Career
In his first Tour De France in 1909, he abandoned early due to wintery conditions during the month of July, but not before
he managed a Stage 2 second place behind Tour winner Francois Faber. The following year he went head-to-head with Alcyon teammate Faber who led comfortably until colliding with a dog at the foot of the Pyrenees. Lapize finally won by just 4 points helped by a number of punctures to Faber's bike on the final stage from Caen to Paris. In a total of six starts in the Tour De France between 1909 and 1914, this victory was the only one he finished.

While climbing the Col d'Aubsique (via the Col du Soulor and the Col de Tortes) in the 1910 Tour de France he is reported to have said to the race organisers: "Vous êtes des criminels !"' (French for 'You are criminals!')" Later, at the stage finish in Bayonne, he is reported to have told a reporter that "Desgrange est un assassin"said (French for 'Desgrange is a murderer!") The stage in question was 326 kilometers in length and featured the climbs of the Col de Peyresourde, Col d'Aspin, Col du Tourmalet, Col du Soulor, Col de Tortes and the Col d'Aubisque. Lapize won the stage.

The First World War ended his cycling career. As a fighter pilot in the French army, Octave Lapize was shot down near Flirey, Meurthe-et-Moselle on 14 July 1917.  Fatally wounded, he died in a hospital in Toul.

Career achievements

Major results

1908
 Summer Olympics Men's 100 kilometres - Bronze Medal
1909
 Paris–Roubaix, 1st Place
1910
 Tour de France - 1st Overall and 4 stage wins (Stage 5, 9, 10, 14)
 Paris–Roubaix, 1st Place
1911
 Paris–Roubaix, 1st Place
 Paris–Tours, 1st Place
 Paris–Brussels, 1st Place
 French National Championships, 1st Place
1912
 Tour de France - Stage 6 win
 Paris–Brussels, 1st Place
 French National Championships, 1st Place
1913
 Paris–Brussels, 1st Place
 French National Championships, 1st Place
1914
 Tour de France - Stage 8 win

Grand Tour results

See also
 List of Olympians killed in World War I

References

Further reading
 

1887 births
1917 deaths
Cyclists from Paris
French male cyclists
French track cyclists
Tour de France winners
Olympic bronze medalists for France
Olympic cyclists of France
Cyclists at the 1908 Summer Olympics
French military personnel killed in World War I
Olympic medalists in cycling
Medalists at the 1908 Summer Olympics